Bartosz Śpiączka (born 19 August 1991) is a Polish professional footballer who plays as a forward for Wisła Płock, on loan from Korona Kielce.

Honours
Górnik Łęczna
II liga: 2019–20

References

External links 
 
 

1991 births
Living people
Polish footballers
Association football forwards
Górnik Łęczna players
Bruk-Bet Termalica Nieciecza players
Dyskobolia Grodzisk Wielkopolski players
Flota Świnoujście players
Podbeskidzie Bielsko-Biała players
GKS Katowice players
Korona Kielce players
Wisła Płock players
Ekstraklasa players
I liga players
II liga players
People from Wolsztyn